S. Karthigesu was the 25th Surveyor General of Sri Lanka. He was appointed in 1961, succeeding J. L. T. E. Dassenaike, and held the office until 1965. He was succeeded by J. C. Chanmugam.

References

Surveyor General of Sri Lanka